Budikovany is a village and municipality in the Rimavská Sobota District of the Banská Bystrica Region of southern Slovakia. Village is situated on the north-east shore of Teplý Vrch (warm hill) lake where river Blh and Drienok creek meet. Today it is a small farming village and a popular place for visitors and outdoors enthusiasts. The village now profits from the proximity of Teplý vrch lake.

History
In the 18th century the village was the property of Muráň castle owners, In 1773 had Budikovany 41 homesteads, in 1828 36 houses. Locals had been engaged in agriculture, wax production, weaving, and fruit growing.

See also
 List of municipalities and towns in Slovakia

References

Genealogical resources

The records for genealogical research are available at the state archive "Statny Archiv in Banska Bystrica, Slovakia"

 Roman Catholic church records (births/marriages/deaths): 1829-1887 (parish B)
 Lutheran church records (births/marriages/deaths): 1743-1841 (parish A)

External links
 
 
Blog about neighboring area
Surnames of living people in Budikovany

Villages and municipalities in Rimavská Sobota District